Zabrat (also, Sabrat) is a settlement and municipality in Baku, Azerbaijan.  It has a population of 22,497.

References 

Populated places in Baku